The Baltic Sea Games was a multi-sport event between countries near the Baltic Sea. It was held on two occasions: first in 1993 then for a final time in 1997.

Estonian officials drove thehe creation of competition, organising a preliminary meeting with other nations in 1988. An agreement was reached at the inaugural Sports Conference of the Baltic Sea Countries in 1989 that Tallinn would host the first games, with the intention of the competition being to use sport to promote understanding and friendship among young people. Despite the break-up of the Soviet Union in this period, ten nations of the Baltic region signed on for the first games in 1993, comprising the three post-Soviet Baltic states (Estonia, Latvia, Lithuania), the three Nordic countries (Denmark, Norway, Sweden), plus Germany, Finland, Poland and Russia.

At the 1993 Baltic Sea Games, a total of 1177 athletes took part in the competition where 170 gold medals were awarded. Lithuania topped the medal table with 39 gold medals among a haul of 95, closely followed by Russia on 38 golds and 90 medals. Poland had the next most gold medals, with 23, while the hosts Estonia had the next highest medal tally, with 81.

The 1997 Baltic Sea Games followed on schedule, with the Lithuanian capital Vilnius serving as host. The competition was greatly expanded, with 2250 athletes present and 221 gold medals given out. Only volleyball was dropped from the sports programme, while ten new discrete sports added. All the original nations returned and Belarus competed for the first (and only) time. The hosts Lithuania repeated as medal table winners, with 62 gold medals and 178 medals in total. Newcomers Belarus had the next highest gold medal count on 58 and Russia had the second highest medal total with 129. Poland also performed well, with the fourth best tally in both gold medals and overall.

The Latvian capital Riga intended to host the 2001 edition of the games, but it was abandoned due to lack of support among the competing nations.

Editions

Baltic Sea Youth Games

Participation

Sports

Medal table

Athletics gold medalists

Men's 100 metres
1993: 
1997:

Men's 200 metres
1993: 
1997:

Men's 400 metres
1993: 
1997:

Men's 800 metres
1993: 
1997:

Men's 1500 metres
1993: 
1997:

Men's 5000 metres
1993: 
1997:

Men's 10,000 metres
1993:

Men's 3000 metres steeplechase
1993: 
1997:

Men's 110 metres hurdles
1993: 
1997:

Men's 400 metres hurdles
1993: 
1997:

Men's high jump
1993: 
1997:

Men's pole vault
1993:

Men's long jump
1993: 
1997:

Men's triple jump
1993: 
1997:

Men's shot put
1993: 
1997:

Men's discus throw
1993: 
1997:

Men's hammer throw
1993: 
1997:

Men's javelin throw
1993: 
1997:

Men's 4 × 100 metres relay
1993:

Men's 4 × 400 metres relay
1993: 
1997:

Women's 100 metres
1993: 
1997:

Women's 200 metres
1993: 
1997:

Women's 400 metres
1993: 
1997:

Women's 800 metres
1993: 
1997:

Women's 1500 metres
1993: 
1997:

Women's 3000 metres
1993:

Women's 5000 metres
1997:

Women's 100 metres hurdles
1993: 
1997:

Women's 400 metres hurdles
1993: 
1997:

Women's high jump
1993: 
1997:

Women's long jump
1993: 
1997:

Women's triple jump
1993: 
1997:

Women's shot put
1993: 
1997:

Women's discus throw
1993: 
1997:

Women's javelin throw
1993: 
1997:

Women's 4 × 100 metres relay
1993:

See also
 SELL Student Games

References

Edition and medal information
Bell, Daniel (2003). Encyclopedia of International Games. McFarland and Company, Inc. Publishers, Jefferson, North Carolina. .
Athletics champions information
Baltic Sea Games. GBR Athletics. Retrieved 2021-01-22.

Baltic region
European international sports competitions
Sport in the Baltic states
Multi-sport events in Europe
Recurring sporting events established in 1993
Recurring sporting events disestablished in 1997
1993 establishments in Estonia